The 1999 Grolsch Open, also known as the Dutch Open, was an ATP men's tennis tournament played on outdoor clay courts in Amsterdam, Netherlands that was part of the World Series of the 1999 ATP Tour. It was the 40th edition of the tournament and was held from 2 to 8 August. Sixth-seeded Younes El Aynaoui won the singles title.

Finals

Singles

 Younes El Aynaoui defeated  Mariano Zabaleta 6–0, 6–3
 It was El Aynaoui's first singles title of his career.

Doubles

 Sjeng Schalken /  Paul Haarhuis defeated  Devin Bowen /  Eyal Ran 6–3, 6–2

References

 
Dutch Open (tennis)
1999 in Dutch tennis
Dutch Open (tennis), 1999